Priče o životu (trans. Tales of Life) is the second studio album by Serbian heavy metal band Alogia, released in 2004.

Track listing
"Reditus" - 4:38
"Novi dan" - 6:23
"Trgovci dušama" - 4:37
"Još samo ovaj put" - 4:57
"Metamorfoza" - 10:14
"Kao snegovi" - 3:42
"Egregor" - 3:09
"Magija" - 7:24
"Putnik na raskršću" - 5:49
"Lišće minulih jeseni" - 5:40
"Ambis" - 3:53
"Vreme istine" - 4:27
"Priča o životu" - 3:57
"30072003" - 4:10
"What a Feeling" (Bonus track) - 3:19

Limited edition bonus track
"Gde si u ovom glupom hotelu"
"Summernight Romance"
"Before The Leaving"
"Satin Doll"

Personnel
Nikola Mijić - vocals
Srđan Branković - guitar
Miroslav Branković - guitar
Ivan Vasić - bass guitar
Branislav Dabić - keyboards
Vladimir Đedović - keyboards
Damir Adžić - drums

References

External links
Priče o životu at Encyclopaedia Metallum

Alogia (band) albums
2004 albums
Serbian-language albums
One Records (Serbia) albums